Loco is an unincorporated community in Lincoln County, in the U.S. state of Georgia.

History
The name "Loco" most likely is derived from the Chickasaw language.
A post office called Loco was established in 1890, and remained in operation until 1942.

Loco has a Baptist church, which was established in 1895. The GNIS also lists the name as "Loce".

References

Unincorporated communities in Lincoln County, Georgia
Unincorporated communities in Georgia (U.S. state)